Sheffield High School (SHS) is an independent girls' school in Sheffield, South Yorkshire, England part of the Girls' Day School Trust (GDST).

History

In February 1878 a meeting was held at the Cutlers' Hall seeking support for a proposal to set up a girls’ school in Sheffield. On 12 March 1878 the school accepted its first 39 pupils in its town-centre premises, the old Surrey Street Music Hall.

In 1884 the school moved its premises to 10 Rutland Park where it resides today.
In 1917 the school purchased Moor Lodge to be used as a girls' boarding house.
In 1939 with the onset of war, the school was evacuated to Cliff College, Calver, Derbyshire.

To celebrate the school's 125th Birthday in 2003, the school had a giant party. A calendar was made with a different photo for each month. For the front cover, Shaun Bloodworth (a parent of one of the pupils) set up a camera on top of the science block with an image painted onto the lens. Prefects were sent onto the field below with bags of pegs and string and were shouted instructions from the rooftop until the numbers 1, 2 and 5 were laid out.

Each pupil was given a bone china mug with a cartoon (called 'Girls Through The Ages') of different uniforms worn in the high school, drawn by art teacher, Miss Hanlon.

A ceremony was held at the Octagon Centre, Sheffield on 11 March 2003.

Recent changes to the school
In 2007 the school acquired No.4 Melbourne Avenue as a new infant building thus enlarging the Junior building to incorporate a new library. Also in 2007 the science block underwent a total refurbishment of the chemistry, physics and biology laboratories.
In 2006–7 the Art department within Moor Lodge was refurbished and extended; two new art rooms and a new ICT suite were created.
In the summer of 2010 an extension to the Sixth Form Centre was completed, providing additional classrooms and an Independent Learning Centre. Since then the Main reception area has been redesigned and a number of classrooms refurbished including an additional ICT suite.

In 2018, the school merged with Ashdell Preparatory school.  The infant school moved to be housed at the former Ashdell site, whilst the Junior school spread over the former Junior and Infant site at Melbourne Avenue.

Also in 2018, headmistress Mrs Dunsford announced her retirement, to be replaced by Mrs Nina Gunson.

Present day
The school premises can be seen to be split between four sites; the infant school, at the former Ashdell School on Fulwood Road, the site on Melbourne Avenue consists of the canteen, school uniform shop and Junior School, the Sixth Form Centre which is located further up Melbourne Avenue overlooking the astroturf, and the main site at Rutland Park.
The Senior School is located on Rutland Park, consisting of the sports hall, 'old gym', School House, Ash Grove, Moor Lodge and Main School. Both sites share the sports facilities and canteen.
The school has around 1000 pupils aged four to eighteen. As of 2009, the school has examination pass rates of over 99% at A-level, AS level and GCSE. The school does not reveal the proportion of those sitting the entrance exam who are then admitted. Almost all the girls proceed to higher education, with over 90% obtaining a place at their first choice of university.  The declared destinations on the school's website show that, of the 92 leavers of 2009, four went on to either Oxford or Cambridge universities, eleven took a gap year, and the remainder went on to Higher Education courses.

The school was the winner of Norwich Union's 'Best Independent School for Sport' 2005-2006, and currently has many successful teams in a range of sports.  The sports that are offered by the senior school include:
Athletics
Badminton
Cross-Country
Equestrian
Gymnastics
Hockey
Lacrosse
Martial arts
Netball
Rounders
Tennis
Trampolining

Home matches are held at the school on Saturdays for both hockey and netball, and league matches are regularly played after school during the week.

Although not officially connected, the high school has some informal links with Birkdale, a nearby independent boys' school. Pupils from both schools travel jointly by coach service to areas such as Chesterfield, Clowne, Dronfield, Tankersley, Tickhill, and Wickersley. School trips and sports tournaments such as 'Girls versus Birkdale' netball matches are also arranged for charitable purposes during the annual 'house charity week'.

Buildings

 Ash Grove (Music)
 Canteen
 Main Building (Maths, English, History, Languages)
 Moor Lodge (Year 11 base, Geography, ICT, RE, Business, Art)
 School House (Drama, PSHE )
 Sixth Form Centre
 Sports Hall
 The Junior Department is now housed in two adjacent buildings —in Melbourne House and in the refurbished premises at No. 4 Melbourne Avenue.
 The infant block is now housed at the former Ashdell Preparatory School site.

Headmistresses
 Miss Mary Alger (March–December 1878)
 Mrs E Woodhouse (1878–1898)
 Miss A E Escott (1898–1917)
 Mrs A Doncaster (1917–1919)
 Miss M Aitken (1919–1926)
 Miss D L Walker (1926–1936)
 Miss M E Macauley (1936–1947)
 Miss M E A Hancock (1947–1959)
 Miss M C Lutz (1959–1983)
 Miss Diana M Skilbeck MBE (1983–1989)
 Margaret Houston (1989–2003)
 Valerie A Dunsford (2004-2018)
Mrs Nina Gunson (2018–present)

Houses
The Senior school is split into four houses named after the four founding members of the school Maria Grey, Mary Gurney, Emily Shirreff and Lady Stanley of Alderley. Their portraits are displayed on the stairs by the reception.  House colours are as follows:

 Grey
 Gurney
 Shirreff
 Stanley

Houses in the Infant and Junior Department reflect this system. Grey is known as 'Amethysts', Gurney is called 'Emeralds', Shirreff is known as 'Sapphires' and Stanley is called 'Rubies'.
A pupil is allocated a house when they join the school; this may be affected by the houses of other siblings already in the school, or the houses of other relatives.

Numerous events and competitions are organised each year; these include netball, rounders and athletics events, art competitions, Year 7 Mathematics Day and House Charities Week.
House captains for the year are appointed by the school's Senior Management Team following consultation with members of staff. Captains for winter and summer sports are also chosen and take a leading role in the annual sports day which is held at Woodburn Road Stadium.

Fees
Annual fees at the school in 2019 ranged from £9,216 (for reception to year 2 pupils), to £12,975 (year 7 to year 13. Lunch is also mandatory from reception to year 7, incurring a further charge of £542.50 per year.

Sixth form
Approximately 200 pupils attend years 12 and 13. Girls study for academic AS and A2 levels, including more specialist subjects such as Geology, Latin and Russian. In year 12, girls undergo an enrichment process where they can choose which activities they wish to participate in including:

The Young Enterprise Award
Sport
Assisting with Junior School classes
Peer education (teaching younger girls PSHE)
Helping with the school magazine
Charity work
Leadership studies

Sixth form pupils do not wear uniform and, upon signing out, may leave school during the day if they do not have any timetabled lessons—a privilege not granted to younger pupils. A new Kitchen/Diner was created in late 2009 for use by all Sixth Form pupils, to provide basic cooking and dining facilities.  Each year has its own common room and a sixth form assembly is held in the hall once every two weeks.  This extension was completed in the summer of 2010 and now provides additional teaching classrooms and an 'Independent Learning Centre' with a library and ICT facilities.

Awards
 The school was awarded the prize for the most 'Environmentally Friendly Secondary School in Sheffield', at the 2009 Sheffield Telegraph Environment Awards.
In 2008, the School became one of the first 15 schools in the UK to be fully accredited for the Go4it Award for which as school was deemed to demonstrate a culture of creativity, innovation, positive risk-taking, a ‘can do’ attitude and an adventure for learning.  Presentation of Go4It badges are made at the end of each school term to girls that the school's pupil led committee feels have fulfilled the criteria.
 Winner of the Daily Telegraph/Norwich Union Award for Best Independent School for Sport 2005.  The award was made at a ceremony in London in December 2006 and the School displays the logo related to this award within its website.
 The School won Independent School Awards in 2010, 2011, 2012 and 2013 and was shortlisted again in 2014. It has been nominated for a fifth award in 2015.

School publications
Each year girls from the school help to write and publish the magazine, High Times. The magazine is published towards the end of the autumn term each year and features articles about recent school events, interviews with new or departing teachers, photos and art work from the pupils. Volunteers from Years 12 and 13 write and edit the magazine as part of their enrichment programme with assistance from girls in younger years 7 through 10.
This was edited by Mr Nichols until 2006, Miss K Henderson 2006-2008 and by Mrs L Downes since then it has been edited by a group of staff and students.  A school calendar is published termly featuring upcoming events, as well as the High Flyer and International High Flyer leaflets published at least three times a year.

Awards ceremony
An annual awards ceremony is held at the Octagon Centre to celebrate the school's achievements. Awards are given for a range of sporting and academic achievements such as 'Loyalty to School Sport' and the 'Mrs Ames’ Spoken English Prize'.  Each year a speech is given by an external speaker, the Headmistress, the Chairman of Governors and a 'Vote of Thanks' is given by the incoming Head Girl.

Notable former pupils

 Deborah Ann Barham, comedy writer
 A. S. Byatt, novelist
 Dehenna Davison, MP for Bishop Auckland
 Margaret Drabble, novelist, sister of A.S. Byatt
 Louise Haigh, Labour MP for the Sheffield Heeley constituency
Lydia Manley Henry, first female medical graduate of Sheffield University
 Angela Knight
 Cicely Mayhew, UK's first female diplomat
Mary Taylor Slow, physicist and first woman to take up the study of radio as a profession

References

External links
 School Website
 Profile on the ISC website
 Profile on MyDaughter

Girls' schools in South Yorkshire
Schools of the Girls' Day School Trust
Member schools of the Girls' Schools Association
Private schools in Sheffield
Educational institutions established in 1878
1878 establishments in England